Luke Anthony Borusiewicz (22 September 2006 – 18 January 2009) was a toddler in Queensland, Australia, who died while under foster care administered by the Department of Community Services (DOCS), an agency of the Department of Communities, Queensland.

Borusiewicz died on Sunday 18 January 2009, aged 2 years. The inquest into his death found it to be accidental, the result of falling from his bed and striking his head. It was held amid a major review of the Department of Community Services' activities in the state of Queensland.

History 
Luke Anthony Borusiewicz was aged 2 years and 2 months when he died of head injuries sustained while in the custody of  'Joy', a 74-year-old foster carer, who at the time of his death, had three other foster children in her care. Borusiewicz had been removed from his parents on 5 July 2008 and placed into a foster home from 22 July to 24 December 2008. The premise for the child's removal was alleged drug use by his parents, although his father Michael Borusiewicz claimed he was "clean" for six months before his son's death.

On 23 December the original foster carers were unable to continue the placement due to their own personal circumstances and on 24 December Borusiewicz was placed with Joy. On 12 January 2009, he was admitted to hospital with an undefined head trauma. A DOCS child protection worker stated that the head injuries were acquired while an eight- to nine-year-old foster child was changing Borusiewicz's nappy. Contradictory information was conveyed from the carer, indicating that it was "thought" that Borusiewicz fell from a bed and hit his head. In a third account, the carer stated that he had hit his head during an incident, and then fallen asleep. Borusiewicz allegedly slept from approximately 11 am on the morning of 12 January 2009, and an ambulance was called at 4.45 pm when he could not be woken. When admitted Borusiewicz had to be ventilated. He was found to have a fractured skull, subdural haematoma and brain oedema. An emergency craniotomy was performed. After the operation he required continued ventilation and did not improve. Borusiewicz died after six days on 18 January 2009.

It is alleged that he had sustained previous injuries in his brief stay in foster care.

Investigation and State Coroner's Report 
The State Coroner's Court of Queensland conducted an investigation into Borusiewicz's death, the final summary of findings was handed down on 16 April 2013. The Coroner Kevin Priestly, found that "Luke accidentally fell while on his bed striking his head on the floor, possibly also striking his head on the bed frame during the fall to the floor."

Coroner Priestly found that on 12 January 2009: 

A Department of Communities Placement Details document from 2008 stated: 

Officers from the Department of Communities said that the department had never seen the document. The foster carer, who cannot be named, had previously expressed reluctance to take in such a young ward of the state.

State Inquiry into the Department of Community Services 
 there is a major review into the activities of the Department of Communities, DOCS and related Child Safety sub-contractors and agencies, in the state of Queensland.

The inquiry into the Child Protection system was brought about by the results of the Commission of Inquiry into Abuse of Children in Queensland Institutions (the Forde Inquiry) and the Crime and Misconduct Commission Inquiry. The official preamble to the Queensland Child Protection Commission of Inquiry states (in part):

References

External links 
 Luke's Army – A tribute to Luke Borusiewicz
 Luke's Army on Facebook

2009 in Australia
2009 deaths
Accidental deaths from falls
Accidental deaths in Queensland
Deaths by person in Australia
People from Cairns